List of notable residents of Penzance, a town in the Penwith district of Cornwall, England, United Kingdom.

References

Penzance